General elections were held in Libya to elect the House of Representatives on 7 January 1956.

The House of Representatives had 55 seats, one for every 20,000 inhabitants. Following the 1952 elections, political parties and political gatherings had been banned, so all candidates contested the election as independents. As a result, voting was based largely on personality, clan ties, and nepotism. Thirty candidates were elected unopposed.

References

Libya
1956
1956 in Libya
Non-partisan elections
January 1956 events in Africa